Imdadul Haque Khokon is a Bangladeshi dance director and choreographer. In 2010, he won the Bangladesh National Film Award for Best Choreography for the film Mughal-e-Azam.

Selected films

Awards and nominations
National Film Awards

References

External links
 

Living people
Bangladeshi choreographers
Best Choreography National Film Award (Bangladesh) winners
1962 births